The Municipal Council of Vacoas-Phoenix also known as Municipality is the local authority responsible for the administration of the town of Vacoas-Phoenix, Plaines Wilhems District, Mauritius. The actual Mayor is Praveen Kumar Ramburn and the Deputy Mayor Mike Manfred Roy Mungur.

External links

References 

Vacoas-Phoenix
Local government in Mauritius